The Rhine Gorge is a popular name for the Upper Middle Rhine Valley, a 65 km section of the Rhine between Koblenz and Rüdesheim in the states of Rhineland-Palatinate and Hesse in Germany. It was added to the UNESCO list of World Heritage Sites in June 2002 because of its beauty as a cultural landscape, its importance as a route of transport across Europe, and the unique adaptations of the buildings and terraces to the steep slopes of the gorge.

The region's rocks were laid down in the Devonian period and are known as Rhenish Facies. This is a fossil-bearing sedimentary rock type consisting mainly of slate. The rocks underwent considerable folding during the Carboniferous period. The gorge was carved out during a much more recent uplift to leave the river contained within steep walls 200 m high, the most famous feature being the Loreley.

The gorge produces its own microclimate and has acted as a corridor for species not otherwise found in the region. Its slopes have long been terraced for agriculture, in particular viticulture which has good conditions on south-facing slopes. Most of the vineyards belong to the wine region Mittelrhein, but the southernmost parts of the Rhine Gorge fall in Rheingau and Nahe.

The river has been an important trade route into central Europe since prehistoric times and a string of small settlements has grown up along the banks. Constrained in size, many of these old towns retain a historic feel today. With increasing wealth, roughly 40 hilltop castles were built and the valley became a core region of the Holy Roman Empire. It was at the centre of the Thirty Years' War, which left many of the castles in ruins, a particular attraction for today's cruise ships which follow the river. At one time forming a border of France, in the 19th Century the valley became part of Prussia and its landscape became the quintessential image of Germany.

This part of the Rhine features strongly in folklore, such as a legendary castle on the Rhine being the setting for the opera Götterdämmerung. The annual Rhine in Flames festivals include spectacular firework displays at Sankt Goar in September and Koblenz in August, the best view being from one of a convoy of boats.

Towns and cities along the gorge
Koblenz (west+east)
Lahnstein (east)
Rhens (west)
Braubach (east)
Boppard (west)
St. Goarshausen (east) and almost directly opposite
Sankt Goar (west) by the Loreley rock (east)
Oberwesel (west)
Kaub (east)
Bacharach (west)
Lorch (east)
Assmannshausen (east)
Bingen (west)
Rüdesheim (east)

Gallery

See also 
 Köln-Düsseldorfer

References

External links 

 Upper Middle Rhine Valley – UNESCO World Heritage Centre

World Heritage Sites in Germany
Rhine
Tourist attractions in Rhineland-Palatinate
Water gaps
Valleys of Hesse
Valleys of Rhineland-Palatinate
Cultural landscapes of Germany